The Public English Test System (PETS) is a test developed by the National Education Examinations Authority (NEEA) of Mainland China. The PETS is the edition of the Quanguo Waiyu Shuiping Kaoshi (WSK) for the English language. It is available in five levels: PETS-1 through PETS-5. PETS testing is open to persons of all professions, ages, and academic backgrounds.

The tests were designed in 1996 as a way to test persons outside of the college and university system; the University of Cambridge Local Examinations Syndicate (UCLES) gave professional and technical support to the development. In 1999 pilot tests of the PETS occurred in several cities. The first mass-offering of the PETS was in 2003.

The testing levels are:
 PETS-5: Advanced level, sufficient for studying and/or working outside of China, sufficient for equivalent to an English major at a Chinese university after two years of studying English.
 PETS-4: Upper intermediate level, equivalent to that of a non-English major student at a Chinese university after three years of studying English.
 PETS-3: Intermediate level, equivalent to that of a non-English major student at a Chinese university after two years of studying English. 
 PETS-2: Lower intermediate level, equivalent to that of a student entering university in China.
 PETS-1: Elementary level, equivalent to completion of three years of English instruction, or what someone would have at the junior high school level.
There is also a PETS-1B, which is below PETS-1.

See also
 College English Test (CET)
 English education in China
 General English Proficiency Test (the test in Taiwan)

References
 Liu, Jianda (刘建达; Guangdong University of Foreign Studies). "The Public English Test System" (Chapter 10). In: Cheng, Liying and Andy Curtis. English Language Assessment and the Chinese Learner. Routledge, March 17, 2010. , 9781135213879. Start: p. 132.

Notes

External links
 Public English Test System 
 China Public English Test System (PETS), Levels 1-5: Level Criteria, Test Specifications and Sample Materials. National Education Examinations Authority, 1999. See profile at Google Books.
 "各類語言檢定證照等級對照表" - National Kaohsiung First University of Science and Technology Center for Language Education (語言教學中心) - Comparison chart between different English and other foreign language tests.

Education in China
English language tests